Stanton Rufus Cook (July 3, 1925 – September 3, 2015) was a chief executive of the Chicago Tribune. He took the newspaper public in 1983.

References

1925 births
2015 deaths
American newspaper executives
Businesspeople from Chicago
Northwestern University alumni
United States Army Air Forces officers
20th-century American businesspeople
Military personnel from Illinois